Chris Wood may refer to:

Music
 Chris Wood (jazz musician) (born 1969), jazz bassist with the trio Medeski Martin & Wood
 Chris Wood (rock musician) (1944–1983), saxophonist, flautist with the rock band Traffic
 Chris Wood (folk musician), English folk singer and musician

Sports
 Chris Wood (footballer, born 1955), English footballer who played for Huddersfield Town
 Chris Wood (footballer, born 1987), English footballer who formerly played for Mansfield Town, now Worksop Town
 Chris Wood (footballer, born 1991), New Zealand footballer who plays for Nottingham Forest
 Chris Wood (golfer) (born 1987), English golfer
 Chris Wood (cricketer) (born 1990), English cricketer

Other
 Chris Foote Wood (born 1940), Liberal Democrat politician in County Durham, England
 Chris Wood (actor) (born 1988), American actor
 Chris Wood (diplomat) (born 1959), British diplomat
Chris Wood (CIA), Officer of the Central Intelligence Agency who once led the hunt for Osama Bin Laden

See also
Christian Wood (born 1995), American basketball player
Christopher Wood (disambiguation)
Chris Woods (disambiguation)